Muhammad Sharif Tahir (born 12 June 2002) is a Pakistani wrestler. He competed at the 2022 Commonwealth Games, winning the silver medal in the men's freestyle 74 kg event. He was defeated in the final by Naveen Malik

References 

Living people
Place of birth missing (living people)
2002 births
Pakistani male sport wrestlers
Wrestlers at the 2022 Commonwealth Games
Commonwealth Games silver medallists for Pakistan
Commonwealth Games medallists in wrestling
21st-century Pakistani people
Medallists at the 2022 Commonwealth Games